John Francis McGough (January 4, 1883 – April 14, 1962) was an American football player and coach of football, basketball, and baseball. He served as the head football coach at Gonzaga University in 1916 and at the University of New Mexico in 1919, compiling a career college football record of 6–2–2. McGough was also the head basketball coach at Gonzaga during the 1916–17 season and at New Mexico in 1919, amassing a career college basketball record of 6–9. He was also the head baseball coach at New Mexico from 1919 to 1920, tallying a mark of 6–5. He was later an attorney in Montana.

Coaching career
As basketball coach at Gonzaga, McGough compiled a record of 4–5. At New Mexico, his record was 2–4.

References

1883 births
1962 deaths
Colgate Raiders football players
Gonzaga Bulldogs football coaches
Gonzaga Bulldogs men's basketball coaches
Montana Tech Orediggers football coaches
Montana Tech Orediggers men's basketball coaches
New Mexico Lobos baseball coaches
New Mexico Lobos football coaches
New Mexico Lobos men's basketball coaches
People from Augusta, New York